Jan Furlepa (born 23 April 1956) is a Polish football manager.

References

1956 births
Living people
Polish football managers
Podbeskidzie Bielsko-Biała managers
Piast Gliwice managers
Odra Opole managers
People from Kętrzyn
I liga managers
II liga managers